John Skylstead Rhoades Sr. (March 18, 1925 – September 3, 2007) was a United States district judge of the United States District Court for the Southern District of California.

Education and career

Born in Havre, Montana, Rhoades was in the United States Navy during World War II, from 1943 to 1946. He received an Artium Baccalaureus degree from Stanford University in 1948 and a Juris Doctor from the University of California, Hastings College of the Law in 1951. He was in the United States Navy Reserve following World War II, from 1946 to 1966. He was a prosecuting attorney of San Diego, California from 1955 to 1956. He was a deputy city attorney of San Diego from 1956 to 1957. He was in private practice in San Diego from 1957 to 1985.

Federal judicial service

Rhoades was nominated by President Ronald Reagan on September 27, 1985, to a seat on the United States District Court for the Southern District of California vacated by Judge Leland Chris Nielsen. He was confirmed by the United States Senate on October 25, 1985, and received his commission on October 28, 1985. He assumed senior status on November 4, 1995. Rhoades served in that capacity until September 3, 2007, when he died in San Diego while in the hospital recovering from heart surgery the previous June.

References

Sources
 

1925 births
2007 deaths
University of California, Hastings College of the Law alumni
Stanford University alumni
United States Navy sailors
Judges of the United States District Court for the Southern District of California
United States district court judges appointed by Ronald Reagan
20th-century American judges
Lawyers from San Diego
People from Havre, Montana